Théo Emmanuelli (born 31 January 2000) is a French professional footballer who plays as a defender for  club Ajaccio.

Career
Emmanuelli made his professional debut with Ajaccio in a 0–0 Ligue 2 tie with Auxerre on 7 August 2021.

References

External links
 

2000 births
Living people
Sportspeople from Nogent-sur-Marne
French footballers
Footballers from Val-de-Marne
Association football defenders
Ligue 2 players
Championnat National 3 players
AC Ajaccio players